Eugene Dabit (21 September 1898 in Mers-les-Bains – 21 August 1936 in Sevastopol) was a French socialist writer.

He was part of the group "proletarian literature" and had a great success for his novel L'Hôtel du Nord which won the du Prix du roman populiste and was filmed in 1938 by Marcel Carné. He maintained an important correspondence with Roger Martin du Gard.  Dabit was a friend and literary and political associate of André Gide; he died of an illness while accompanying Gide on a trip to the Soviet Union in 1936.

Dabit was also an artist, having studied at the École des Beaux-Arts with Louis-François Biloul.

Works

Petit Louis (1930)
L'Hôtel du Nord (1929)
Yvonne (1929 - inédit, éd. 2009)
La zone verte (1935, rééd. 2009)
Les maîtres de la peinture espagnole (1937)
Au Pont Tournant
Le mal de vivre (avec Étrangères)(1937)
Train de vies
Faubourgs de Paris
Un mort tout neuf
L’île (Gallimard, 1934)
Villa Oasis ou Les faux bourgeois (1932)
Ville lumière
Journal intime (1926-1938)

References

External links

20th-century French novelists
20th-century French male writers
1898 births
1936 deaths
French socialists
Burials at Père Lachaise Cemetery
French male novelists